is a retired Japanese rhythmic gymnast.

She competed for Japan in the individual rhythmic gymnastics all-around competition at the 1984 Olympic Games in Los Angeles. She tied for 9th place in the qualification round and advanced to the final, placing 8th overall.

References

External links 
 Hiroko Yamasaki at Sports-Reference.com

1960 births
Living people
Japanese rhythmic gymnasts
Gymnasts at the 1992 Summer Olympics
Olympic gymnasts of Japan
Sportspeople from Kagoshima Prefecture